Shree Bose (born March 27, 1994) is an American scientist, inventor, and speaker. She is known as the grand prize winner of the inaugural Google Science Fair in 2011. She is currently an MSTP student at Duke University School of Medicine. For high school, she went to Fort Worth Country Day and graduated in May, 2012. She studied at Harvard College until May, 2016. In 2014, she cofounded Piper, a STEM education company creating engineering kits for children.

Career

Google Science Fair 

In 2011, Shree Bose, then 17 years old and living in Fort Worth, Texas, won the grand prize and $50,000 for her research on the chemotherapy drug, cisplatin, that is commonly taken by women with ovarian cancer, tackling the problem of cancer cells growing resistant to cisplatin over time. Bose has cited her grandfather's passing from lung cancer as one of the drivers of her research. She conducted the research for her science fair project under the mentorship of Dr. Alakananda Basu at the University of North Texas Health Science Center.

Bose gave a talk alongside Lauren Hodge and Naomi Shah—the two other winners of the 2011 Google Science Fair—about their projects and paths in science at TEDxWomen 2011.

The main-belt asteroid 25178 Shreebose was named in her honor.

Piper 
In 2014, she co-founded Piper, a STEM education company creates computer engineering kits that teach children about engineering through the game of Minecraft. The company was created in part with funding from Kickstarter. At the end of her undergraduate studies, she left the company to pursue medicine.

Other Work 
On March 21, 2014, Bose spoke on a panel, moderated by Bill Clinton, at a Clinton Global Initiative University conference held at Arizona State University, along with Jimmy Wales, John McCain, and Saudi Arabian women's rights activist Manal al-Sharif. The topic of discussion was "the age of participation" and the ability of an increasingly large number of citizens to "express their own opinions, pursue their own educations, and launch their own enterprises."

In 2018, she was featured by Microsoft on their advertising campaign for Windows 10.

She was included as part of the 2023 Forbes 30 Under 30 class under the Science category.

Education 
Bose attended high school at Fort Worth Country Day School, graduating in 2012. She attended Harvard College in Cambridge, Massachusetts where she was featured as one of the 15 Most Interesting Seniors by the Harvard Crimson. She completed her B.A. in Molecular and Cellular Biology in May 2016, and is, since fall 2016, studying for an MD and Ph.D. at Duke University School of Medicine.

References 

1994 births
Living people
21st-century American inventors
Harvard College alumni
American women company founders
American company founders
American people of Indian descent
American women scientists
Women inventors
21st-century American women